Natal Command was a Command of the South African Army. It was headquartered in Durban, South Africa. By the 1980s, it was responsible for the security of the region, forming the primary level of command for military operations in support of the Police. It also provided logistic, administrative and service support to units and formations operating in its area of responsibility.

History

Origin

Union Defence Force

Under the Union Defence Force, South Africa was originally divided into 9 military districts. Lieutenant Colonel J. Daniel  was Officer Commanding on 3 September 1939. The command included the 1st South African Brigade at Pietermaritzburg with two battalions of the Royal Natal Carabineers and the Umvoti Mounted Rifles, the 7th South African Infantry Brigade (including the Natal Mounted Rifles), two batteries of the South African Permanent Garrison Artillery, and the Natal Field Artillery on 3 September 1939.

Brigadiers Harold Willmott and Deon Ferreira served as officers commanding Natal Command after the Second World War.

SADF

From August 1974 84 Motorised Brigade was based at the Old Fort Road Military Base in Durban. While the brigade was part of 8th South African Armoured Division rather than Natal Command, its units were mostly located within the command's boundaries. These included the Durban Light Infantry (located nearby in their historic buildings within the Greyville Racecourse), the Durban Regiment, 84 Signal Unit SACS, 15 Maintenance Unit SAOSC, 19 Field Engineer Regiment SAEC, and Natal Field Artillery. Other units seemingly associated with the brigade included the First City Regiment and Regiment Port Natal, both infantry units.

In the early 1980s, the command included headquarters at Durban, 5 South African Infantry Battalion at Ladysmith, 15 Maintenance Unit in Durban, and two Commandos, the Tugela Commando and the Umvoti Commando, both based in Durban. It seems reasonably clear that in the research for World Armies a number of units assigned to the command at the time were missed.

84 Motorised Brigade became 9 South African Division in 1992, and later 75 Brigade, before disbanding  with the creation of the 'type' formations.

Groups and Commandos  

For Territorial forces a structure of "groups" was established during the 1980s. Each of these regional groups fell under the authority of a Command and exercised operational control over a number of units, mostly Commandos.

Natal Command had three Groups (originally four) under command.

Group 9 (Pietermaritzburg) 
 Midland Commando
 Midmar Commando
 Natalia Commando
 Umkomaas Commando
 Umvoti Commando
 Weenan-Kliprivier Commando
 Griqualand East Commando

Group 10 (Montclair) 
 Bluff Commando
 Durban North Commando
 Durban South Commando
 Highway Commando
 Oribi Commando
 South Coast Commando
 Umgeni Commando

Group 11 (Dundee) 
 Drakensberg Commando
 Dundee and District Commando

Group 27 (Eshowe) 
 Insele Commando
 Northern Natal Commando
 Pongola Commando
 Tugela Commando
 Umkhombe Commando

SANDF 
SANDF director of facilities Brigadier General G Mngadi said the beach front property, formerly occupied by Headquarters Natal Command and later by the Joint Operations Division's eastern Joint Tactical Headquarters, “was leased by the National Department of Public Works for the South African Defence Force on a 99 year lease from the erstwhile Durban Corporation, now known as the Ethekweni Municipality.”
Mngadi says that as a result of the consolidation of the facilities footprint in Durban, the facility had become superfluous and was returned to the city on October 16, 2009.

Leadership

Notes

References

See also 
 South African Army Order of Battle 1940

External links 
 
 
 
 
 

Commands of the South African Army
Disbanded military units and formations in Durban
Military units and formations disestablished in the 1990s